Djiré Massourata (born November 11, 1983) is an Ivorian female professional basketball player.

External links
Equipe nationale de Basket

1983 births
Living people
Ivorian women's basketball players